Up at Night is the debut full-length album by pop music group Cimorelli. The album comes nine years after the group first began posting videos of themselves singing on YouTube, and features fourteen original songs. The album was announced via a live stream on the group's YouTube channel.

The album was released to fans on May 17, 2016, through PledgeMusic.

"Hearts on Fire" was the first track available to fans, and a download link was made available through PledgeMusic. "I'm a Mess" was released on April 1, 2016  and "Fall Back" was released on May 10, 2016.

The Up at Night pre-release listening party was held at the Big Machine Store in Nashville, Tennessee on May 14, 2016.

Album artwork
The official album cover was designed by Charmaine Cheng and was shot by photographer Acacia Evans. Band member Dani Cimorelli designed the whole album booklet and the back cover of the album CD.

Track listing

Music videos

Charts

References

2016 debut albums
Cimorelli albums